Venantas Lašinis (born 26 February 1997) is a Lithuanian cyclist, who currently rides for UCI Continental team .

Major results

Road

2015
 2nd Road race, National Junior Road Championships
2016
 National Under-23 Road Championships
3rd Time trial
4th Road race
2017
 1st  Time trial, National Under-23 Road Championships
 5th Road race, National Road Championships
 9th Overall Baltic Chain Tour
2018
 2nd Time trial, National Under-23 Road Championships
 3rd Overall Tour of Iran (Azerbaijan)
1st Young rider classification
 7th Overall Carpathian Couriers Race
 9th Minsk Cup
2019
 National Under-23 Road Championships
2nd Road race
2nd Time trial
 3rd Road race, National Road Championships
 4th Overall Carpathian Couriers Race
 7th Grand Prix Minsk
2020
 National Road Championships
2nd Road race
3rd Time trial
2021
 3rd Time trial, National Road Championships
2022
 National Road Championships
1st  Road race
3rd Time trial
 9th Overall Baltic Chain Tour

Track

2017
 National Championships
1st  Individual pursuit
1st  Points race
2018
 National Championships
1st  Individual pursuit
1st  Scratch
2nd Points race
2019
 National Championships
1st  Points race
1st  Scratch
3rd Individual pursuit
3rd Elimination race
2021
 National Championships
1st  Team pursuit
2nd Scratch
3rd Team sprint

Cyclo-cross
2019–20
 2nd National Championships
2020–21
 2nd National Championships
2021–22
 1st  National Championships

References

External links

1997 births
Living people
Lithuanian male cyclists
Cyclists at the 2019 European Games
European Games competitors for Lithuania
Cyclo-cross cyclists